Jochen Seitz (born 11 October 1976) is a German professional football manager and former player who is the head coach of Regionalliga Bayern club Viktoria Aschaffenburg.

Seitz played professionally in his country for Hamburger SV, SpVgg Unterhaching, VfB Stuttgart, FC Schalke 04, Kaiserslautern, TSG 1899 Hoffenheim and Alemannia Aachen. Towards the end of his career, he had a two-year stint at Bulgarian side Chernomorets Burgas.

Playing career
Seitz signed with Bulgarian Chernomorets Burgas for two years on 4 July 2009. He made his team debut a few days later, in a 2–0 friendly win against Chernomorets Pomorie. He left the club on 1 June 2011 after his contract expired.

Honours
VfB Stuttgart
UEFA Intertoto Cup: 2000, 2002

Schalke 04
UEFA Intertoto Cup: 2003

References

External links
 
 

Living people
1976 births
People from Erlenbach am Main
Sportspeople from Lower Franconia
German footballers
Footballers from Bavaria
Association football midfielders
Association football fullbacks
Germany B international footballers
Bundesliga players
2. Bundesliga players
First Professional Football League (Bulgaria) players
Viktoria Aschaffenburg players
Hamburger SV players
SpVgg Unterhaching players
VfB Stuttgart players
FC Schalke 04 players
1. FC Kaiserslautern players
TSG 1899 Hoffenheim players
Alemannia Aachen players
PFC Chernomorets Burgas players
German expatriate footballers
German expatriate sportspeople in Bulgaria
Expatriate footballers in Bulgaria
German football managers
Viktoria Aschaffenburg managers
Regionalliga managers